Attainder of Duke of Northumberland and others Act 1553 (1 Mar. Session 2 c.16) is an Act of the Parliament of England which confirmed the attainders for High Treason against John Duke of Northumberland, Thomas Cranmer the Archbishop of Canterbury, William Marquess of Northampton, John Earl of Warwick, Sir Ambrose Dudley, Sir Andrew Dudley, Sir John Gates, and Sir Thomas Palmer.

It was repealed by section 1(1) of, and Part 4 of Schedule 1 to, the Statute Law (Repeals) Act 1977 (c.18).

References
Chronological Table of the Statutes: 1235-2007, UK Stationery Office (2009) p. 52

1553 in law
1553 in England
Acts of the Parliament of England (1485–1603)